Sandrine Mazetier (born 16 December 1966 in Rodez, Aveyron) is a member of the National Assembly of France.  She represents the city of Paris,  and is a member of the Socialiste, radical, citoyen et divers gauche.

References

1966 births
Living people
People from Rodez
Socialist Party (France) politicians
Women members of the National Assembly (France)
Deputies of the 13th National Assembly of the French Fifth Republic
Deputies of the 14th National Assembly of the French Fifth Republic
21st-century French women politicians
Members of Parliament for Paris